TVRI Sport (also referred to as Kanal 4 TVRI Olahraga) is an Indonesian terrestrial television channel owned by public broadcaster TVRI, specialised in sports programming. Serves as complementary to TVRI main channel, the channel is available only in digital terrestrial, satellite, and TVRI Klik streaming service.

History 

TVRI Sport was launched as one of two initial digital television channels set up by TVRI following the government plan to introduce digital television in Indonesia, as well as one of the Indonesian first digital television channels. TVRI 4, as it was called, was launched on 21 December 2010 as the first Indonesian digital broadcast is launched in Jakarta, Surabaya (East Java) and Batam (Riau Islands). Together with its sister channel TVRI 3 (currently TVRI World) as well as the digital broadcast of TVRI Nasional and local TVRI stations, the channel was officially launched by President Susilo Bambang Yudhoyono, Minister of Communications and Information Technology Tifatul Sembiring and TVRI President Director Imas Sunarya.

In 2018, TVRI 4 changed its name to TVRI Sport HD. Later in 2022, the channel changed its name again to simply TVRI Sport.

Current coverage

Indonesia

International

Shows 
 Monitor Olahraga
 Olahraga Kampung
 Otosport
 Rumah Bulutangkis
 Globe Soccer Awards (2019–present)

Former coverage

Indonesia

Football 
Liga Indonesia (until ??)
 2015 Liga Santri Nusantara final

Badminton 

 PBSI

Basketball 

 2017–18 Srikandi Cup (Indonesia Women's Basketball Championship)
 Indonesian Basketball League (2013-2015, 2020, and 2021)

Volleyball 

 2015 Livoli

International 
 Winter Olympics (opening and closing ceremonies only in 2014 and 2018)

Football 
 FIFA World Cup (until 1998)
 2021 FIFA Club World Cup
 Brasil Global Tour (both matches in September 2019 only)
Premier League (2019–20 only (exclude Q4), originally until 2021–22)
 Ligue 1 (2009–10 only)
 Serie A (2012–13 and the first half of 2013–14, originally until 2014–15)
 Dutch Eerste Divisie (2017–18 only)

Basketball 
 2019 FIBA World Cup

Badminton 

 BWF

Motorsport 

 Formula E (2019-20 and 2021)

Sepak takraw 

 2019 Sepak Takraw League (Champions Cup only)

Shows 

 Kick Off
 Dibalik Sang Juara
 Ring Tinju/Rock n Round
 Varia Olahraga

See also 
 TVRI
 TVRI World

References

External links 
 TVRI official website
 Official Twitter account of TVRI Sport HD
 Official YouTube channel "TVRI Sport"

Sports television in Indonesia
Television stations in Indonesia
Television channels and stations established in 2010
2010 establishments in Indonesia